The universal wavefunction (or wave function), introduced by Hugh Everett in his 1973 PhD thesis The Theory of the Universal Wave Function,  informs a core concept in the relative state interpretation or many-worlds interpretation of quantum mechanics. It later received investigation from James Hartle and Stephen Hawking in which they derived a specific solution to the Wheeler–deWitt equation to explain the initial conditions of the Big Bang cosmology.

Everett's thesis introduction reads:

The universal wave function is the wavefunction or quantum state of the totality of existence, regarded as the "basic physical entity" or "the fundamental entity, obeying at all times a deterministic wave equation."

Everett's response to Streater
Ray Streater writes:

Hugh Everett's response:

See also
 Hartle–Hawking state
 Heisenberg cut

References

Quantum measurement